Lin-ay sang Negros 2017. the 23rd edition of the annual Lin-ay sang Negros pageant was held on April 28, 2017 at the Pana-ad Stadium. A total of 12 cities and 12 municipalities sent their representatives. Senator Juan Edgardo Angara and Lin-ay sang Negros 2016 winner Alyssa Jimenea of Victorias City, crowned her successor Angelika Esther Portugaleza of Bago at the end of the event. This is the first win for Bago since the pageant's inception in 1994.

Final results

Contestants

Significant Notes

The pageant was directed by VTeam Network and was streamed via FB Live for the first time in the pageant history.

Hosts

 Mikoy Morales -  GMA Kapuso Artist
 Jan Nicole Puentebella - Lin-ay sang Negros 2006

Panel of Judges

 Don Mcgyver Cochico - Manhunt International Philippines 2015 Winner
 Shannon Rebecca Bridgman - Miss Philippines Air 2016
 Jason Javelona - commercial model in the 90's from Negros
 AR Dela Serna - Print ad and runway model, Mister Supranational Philippines 2016
 Victoria Durana - Lin-ay sang Negros 2000
 Ricky Abad Jr. - Pageant Director, Chairman of the Board

Performances

 Dingdong Dantes GMA Kapuso Artist

References

Beauty pageants in the Philippines
Culture of Negros Occidental
2017 beauty pageants
April 2017 events in the Philippines